Osumamu Adama (born December 24, 1980) is a Ghanaian professional boxer in the middleweight division, and the first middleweight titleholder from Ghana.

Early life
One of nine children, Osamamu grew up in Accra into a large family, and helped to take care of his six sisters and two brothers. His late mother worked in a grocery store, and his father worked in an ice cream factory. Osumamu attended Kotobabi Technical Institute High School in Accra, and earned a four-year college diploma in mechanical engineering. He later worked as a mechanical engineer for a company in Accra. Whilst growing, his favorite sport was playing soccer, which he still enjoys.

Amateur boxing career and Olympics
Osumanu Adama compiled an amateur boxing record of 54–4 with twenty knockouts in Ghana as a light middleweight. He fought in all Africa games in 1999, where he was silver medalist. He also fought in Turkey and in Spain and he won a silver medal in 2000 before the Olympic Games. He was training in Cuba that time. He won an International boxing tournament gold medal in Indianapolis, Indiana, at 69 kilograms. He represented Ghana Boxing at the 2000 Summer Olympics at Darling Harbour in Sydney, Australia, losing in the third round leading by 10 points during the competition when the referee stopped the contest in the third round of his bout against Mohamed Marmouri of Tunisia.

Professional career

Early career 
Adama turned professional in 2001, with a second-round knockout of Akeem Alarape in the Kaneshie Sports Complex in Accra, racking up seventeen wins in Ghana between 2001 and 2010. His first two bouts in the United States in August 2009 and April 2010 were fought without proper training time at super middleweight and light heavyweight, and Adama lost two close decisions.

IBO and USBA titles 
Adama then moved from North Miami, Florida to Chicago and signed with boxing manager Wasfi Tolaymat of the Chicago Fight Club and train under Joseph Awinongya. On December 17, 2010, at UIC Pavilion in Chicago, Adama won his first title, the vacant IBO international middleweight championship, the first middleweight titleholder ever from Ghana, by twelve round unanimous decision over contender Angel Hernandez. Scoring for the bout was 120–108, 120–108, and 119–109, with Adama winning 35 of 36 rounds on the judges' scorecards. After knocking out Marcus Upshaw to win the vacant USBA middleweight title and achieve the IBF's #1 middleweight contender rating. Adama lost a decision for the IBF World Middleweight title in Tasmania in March 2012 against IBF World champion Daniel Geale. After not fighting for over a year, Adama won a split decision over ten rounds over Grady Brewer in March 2013, and was ranked 16th in the world by BoxRec. Between 2010 and 2015, Adama was being trained by former Ghanaian Boxer Joseph Awinongya.

Adama vs. Golovkin 
Adama then (22–3, 16 KO) earned a bout against Gennady Golovkin for the WBA and IBO middleweight titles. Coming into the fight, Adama was ranked #12 by the WBA. The fight took place in Monte Carlo at the Salle des Etoiles on February 1, 2014. He lost by seventh round stoppage. At the end of the first round, Adama got dropped by Golovkin with a solid jab and right hand. Golovkin went on to drop Adama again in the sixth round by landing two sharp left hooks to his head, and then again in the seventh round with a hard jab. Golovkin then nailed Adama with a left hook to the jaw, sending Adama staggering and forcing the referee to stop the bout. At the time of stoppage, one judge had it 60–52 and the other two at 59–53 in favor of Golovkin.

Personal life 
In 2018, Osumanu married his lovely wife.

Professional boxing record

References

External links
 BoxRec Profile
Olympics Profile

1980 births
Living people
Middleweight boxers
Boxers from Accra
Olympic boxers of Ghana
Boxers at the 2000 Summer Olympics
Ghanaian male boxers
African Games silver medalists for Ghana
African Games medalists in boxing
Competitors at the 1999 All-Africa Games
African Boxing Union champions